Pansol is a barangay of Quezon City. According to the 2015 Census, it has a population of 34,240 people.

History
Pansol was originally a sitio of Balara, a barrio originally part of Marikina. It was carved out of Marikina in 1939, pursuant to Commonwealth Act No. 502 that created Quezon City.

Geography

References

Quezon City
Barangays of Quezon City
Barangays of Metro Manila